Catocala is a generally Holarctic genus of moths in the family Erebidae. The genus was erected by Franz von Paula Schrank in 1802. The moths are commonly known as underwing moths or simply underwings. These terms are sometimes used for a few related moths, but usually – especially when used in plural, not as part of a species name – they are used to refer to Catocala only.

Of the more than 250 known species, slightly less than half are found in North America – mostly in the United States – while the rest occur in Eurasia. About one-fifth (almost 30) of these species are native to Europe. A few species occur in the northern Neotropics and Indomalaya.

Description and ecology
Most species of Catocala have medium to large adults, cryptically coloured except for the hindwings, which are marked with stripes in orange, red, white, or even blue. In some, the hindwings are mostly blackish. Unlike what the common name "underwings" seems to suggest, the colour is brightest on the upperside. However, the bright hindwings are not visible at rest, being hidden under the dull forewings – hence the name. Due to their diversity and variety of colors and patterns, underwing moths are popular with collectors of Lepidoptera.

In, The Fauna of British India, Including Ceylon and Burma: Moths Volume II, the genus described as follows.

It is believed that the bright colors, arranged in usually roughly concentric markings, at a casual glance resemble the eyes of a predatory animal, such as a cat. An underwing moth, well camouflaged in its daytime resting spot on a tree trunk or branch, will suddenly flash open the hindwings when disturbed. A bird or other small predator that is not used to this display is likely to be frightened, allowing the moth to escape. However, unlike some other bright-colored moths which are bad-tasting or even poisonous to predators, underwing moths are well palatable at least to some birds (e.g. the blue jay, Cyanocitta cristata). To assist in avoiding nocturnal predators such as bats, these moths also possess (like many of their relatives) fairly well-developed hearing organs.

The caterpillars of most species feed on the leaves of woody plants, usually trees but sometimes shrubs. Typical food plants are Fagales of the families Betulaceae, Fagaceae and Juglandaceae – mainly hickory (Carya), oak (Quercus) and walnut tree (Juglans) species, as well as others such as alder (Alnus), beech (Fagus), birch (Betula) and chestnut (Castanea). The caterpillars of numerous Old World and some North American species feed on the Salicaceae Populus (poplars) and Salix (willows), which belong to the Malpighiales. Less common larval food plants of Catocala are for example elms (Ulmus) and various Rosaceae of the Rosales, Tilia (linden and basswood) of the Malvales, or some Fabaceae of the Fabales; as the preceding, these all belong to the Fabidae lineage of rosid eudicots. More unusually, underwing moth caterpillars have also been found to feed on such plants as maple (Acer) which belongs to a distant lineage of rosids, as well as on such plants as ash trees (Fraxinus) and blueberries (Vaccinium) which are asterids and quite unrelated to the other food plants by eudicot standards.

The adults are predominantly nocturnal, flying from shortly after dusk right up to daybreak. They are generally most active about two hours after nightfall. However, several if not all species of underwing moths have a second activity period exactly around noon, during which they are also regularly found on the wing for about 1–2 hours each day.

The genus name Catocala roughly means "beautiful hindwings". It is a combination of two Ancient Greek words, kato (κάτω, "the rear one" or "the lower one"), and kalos (καλός, "beautiful").

Classification
There are over 250 species in this genus. The species of Catocala are here divided into a Eurasian group, and another one which is found in North America. This does not imply actual relationships; it is mainly done to more conveniently deal with the large number of species. Still, it is not unlikely at all that the groups consist at least to some extent of closely related species.

There are several cryptic species complexes in Catocala, e.g. the group around the Delilah underwing (C. delilah); these and other hitherto unknown species are still being discovered and described in some numbers. Thus, resolving the phylogeny and taxonomy of the underwing moths is an ongoing effort, which has made little progress. In the scientific literature, smaller subdivisions into putatively related species are sometimes applied, but there is no consistent and widely accepted taxonomic treatment for the genus as a whole.

Synonyms
Several distinct genera have formally been proposed for splitting from Catocala, but these are all treated here as junior synonyms. These synonyms and other invalid names of Catocala are:

 Andreusia Hampson, 1913 (unjustified emendation)
 Andrewsia Grote, 1882
 Astiodes (lapsus)
 Astiotes Hübner, 1823
 Belpharidia (lapsus)
 Bihemena Beck, 1966
 Blephara Ochsenheimer, 1816 (unavailable)
 Blepharidia Hübner, 1822
 Blepharonia Hübner, 1823 (unavailable)
 Blepharonia Hübner, 1825
 Blepharum Hübner, 1806 (rejected)
 Catabapta Hulst, 1884
 Catacola (lapsus)
 Catocalla (lapsus)
 Convercala Beck, 1966
 Corisce Hübner, 1823
 Corisee (lapsus)
 Divercala Beck, 1966
 Ephesia Hübner, 1818
 Eucala Beck, 1966
 Eucora Hübner, 1823
 Eunetis Hübner, 1823
 Hemigeometra Haworth, 1809
 Koraia Nye, 1975
 Lamprosia Hübner, [1821]
 Lamprosia Hübner, 1827 (non Hüber, [1821]: preoccupied)
 Metacala Beck, 1966
 Mormonia Hübner, 1823
 Mormosia (lapsus)
 Optocala Beck, 1966
 Promonia Beck, 1966
 Puercala Beck, 1966
 Reticcala Beck, 1966
 Simplicala Beck, 1966

Palearctic species

 Catocala abacta Staudinger, 1900
 Catocala abamita Bremer & Grey, 1853 (including C. scortum)
 Catocala actaea Felder & Rogenhofer, 1874
 Catocala adultera Ménétries, 1856
 Catocala aenigma Sheljuzhko, 1943
 Catocala aestimabilis Staudinger, 1892
 Catocala afghana Swinhoe, 1885
 Catocala agitatrix Graeser, 1889 (including C. mabella)
 Catocala amabilis Bang-Haas, 1907
 Catocala amnonfreidbergi Kravchenko et al., 2008
 Catocala ariana Vartian, 1964
 Catocala armandi (including C. davidi)
 Catocala artobolevskiji Sheljuzhko, 1943
 Catocala bella (including C. serenides)
 Catocala bokhaica
 Catocala borthi Saldaitis, Ivinskis, Floriani & Babics, 2012
 Catocala brandti
 Catocala butleri
 Catocala catei Weisert, 1998
 Catocala chenyixini Ishizuka, 2011
 Catocala columbina
 Catocala coniuncta – Minsmere crimson underwing
 Catocala connexa
 Catocala contemnenda
 Catocala conversa
 Catocala danilovi Bang-Haas, 1927
 Catocala dariana Sviridov, Speidel, Reshöft, 1996
 Catocala davidi Oberthür, 1881
 Catocala deducta Eversmann, 1843
 Catocala dejeani (sometimes in C. kuangtungensis)
 Catocala desiderata
 Catocala detrita Warren, 1913
 Catocala deuteronympha
 Catocala dilecta Hübner, [1808] (type of Astiotes)
 Catocala disjuncta
 Catocala dissimilis (including C. nigricans)
 Catocala distorta Butler, 1889
 Catocala diversa
 Catocala doerriesi
 Catocala dotatoides
 Catocala dula
 Catocala duplicata
 Catocala editarevayae
 Catocala electa – rosy underwing
 Catocala ella Butler, 1877
 Catocala ellamajor Ishizuka, 2010
 Catocala elocata – French red underwing
 Catocala eminens Staudinger, 1892
 Catocala eutychea
 Catocala flavescens
 Catocala florianii Saldaitis & Ivinskis, 2008
 Catocala formosana Okano, 1958
 Catocala fraxini – blue underwing, Clifden nonpareil (type of Hemigeometra)
 Catocala fredi Bytinsky-Salz & Brandt, 1937
 Catocala fugitiva Warren, 1914
 Catocala fulminea (type of Ephesia)
 Catocala fuscinupta
 Catocala gansan Ishizuka & M. Wang, 2013
 Catocala giuditta Schawerda, 1934
 Catocala haitzi Bang-Haas, 1936
 Catocala hariti Ishizuka & Ohshima, 2002
 Catocala helena
 Catocala hoenei Mell, 1936
 Catocala hoferi Ishizuka & Ohshima, 2003
 Catocala hymenaea
 Catocala hymenoides Draeseke, 1927
 Catocala hyperconnexa Sugi, 1965
 Catocala inconstans Butler, 1889
 Catocala infasciata Mell, 1936
 Catocala intacta
 Catocala invasa
 Catocala jansseni A. E. Prout, 1924
 Catocala jonasii Butler, 1877
 Catocala jouga Ishizuka, 2003
 Catocala juncta
 Catocala jyoka Ishizuka, 2006
 Catocala kaki Ishizuka, 2003
 Catocala kasenko Ishizuka, 2007
 Catocala koreana Staudinger, 1892
 Catocala kotschubeyi Sheljuzhko, 1927
 Catocala kuangtungensis
 Catocala kusnezovi Püngeler, 1914
 Catocala lara Bremer, 1861
 Catocala largeteaui Oberthür, 1881
 Catocala laura Speidel, Ivinskis & Saldaitis, 2008
 Catocala leechi
 Catocala lehmanni Speidel, Ivinskis & Saldaitis, 2008
 Catocala lesbia
 Catocala longipalpis Mell, 1936
 Catocala lupina Herrich-Schäffer, [1851]
 Catocala luscinia Brandt, 1938
 Catocala maculata Vincent, 1919
 Catocala mariana
 Catocala martyrum Oberthür, 1881
 Catocala maso Ishizuka, 2011
 Catocala mesopotamica
 Catocala mirifica Butler, 1877
 Catocala moltrechti Bang-Haas, 1927
 Catocala musmi
 Catocala naganoi Sugi, 1982
 Catocala nagioides
 Catocala naumanni Sviridov, 1996
 Catocala neglecta
 Catocala neonympha Esper, 1805 (type of Eucora)
 Catocala nivea Butler, 1877
 Catocala nubila
 Catocala nupta – red underwing
 Catocala nymphaea
 Catocala nymphaeoides Herrich-Schäffer, 1852
 Catocala nymphagoga – oak yellow underwing
 Catocala oberthueri Austaut, 1879
 Catocala obscena Alphéraky, 1879
 Catocala ohshimai Ishizuka, 2001
 Catocala olgaorlovae
 Catocala optata
 Catocala optima – Turanga underwing
 Catocala pacta
 Catocala paki Kishida, 1981
 Catocala patala Felder & Rogenhofer, 1874
 Catocala pataloides
 Catocala persimilis
 Catocala pirata
 Catocala praegnax Walker, 1858
 Catocala prolifica Walker, 1857
 Catocala promissa – light crimson underwing
 Catocala proxeneta Alphéraky, 1895
 Catocala pudica Moore, 1879
 Catocala pudica sabine Saldaitis, Pekarsky & Borth 2014
 Catocala puella
 Catocala puerpera (type of Eunetis)
 Catocala puerperoides
 Catocala remissa
 Catocala repudiata
 Catocala rhodosoma Röber, 1927
 Catocala seibaldi Saldaitis, Ivinskis & Borth, 2010 (including C. pseudoformosana)
 Catocala seiohbo
 Catocala separans
 Catocala separata
 Catocala sinyaevi Sviridov, 2004
 Catocala solntsevi
 Catocala sponsa – dark crimson underwing
 Catocala sponsalis
 Catocala stamensis Kishida & Suzuki, 2002
 Catocala streckeri
 Catocala sultana (sometimes in C. optata)
 Catocala svetlana Sviridov, 1997
 Catocala szechuena
 Catocala tapestrina Moore, 1882
 Catocala thomsoni A. E. Prout, 1924
 Catocala timur – Timur underwing
 Catocala tokui
 Catocala toropovi Saldaitis, Kons & Borth, 2014
 Catocala triphaenoides Oberthür, 1881
 Catocala uljanae Sinyaev, Saldaitis & Ivinskis, 2007
 Catocala viviannae
 Catocala weigerti Hacker, 1999
 Catocala wushensis
 Catocala xarippe Butler, 1877 (formerly in C. fulminea)
 Catocala xizangensis Chen, 1991

Comparison of Eurasian species

Nearctic species

 Catocala abbreviatella
 Catocala agrippina – Agrippina underwing
 Catocala aholibah – Aholibah underwing
 Catocala alabamae – Alabama underwing, titan underwing (including C. olivia, C. titania)
 Catocala allusa (sometimes in C. faustina)
 Catocala amatrix – sweetheart underwing (type of Lamprosia)
 Catocala amestris – three-staff underwing
 Catocala amica – girlfriend underwing (type of Corisce)
 Catocala andromache – Andromache underwing
 Catocala andromedae – Andromeda underwing, gloomy underwing
 Catocala angusi – Angus' underwing
 Catocala antinympha – sweetfern underwing (type of Catabapta)
 Catocala atocala – Atocala underwing, Brou's underwing
 Catocala badia – bay underwing, bayberry underwing, old maid
 Catocala benjamini – Benjamin's underwing (formerly in C. andromache)
 Catocala blandula – charming underwing
 Catocala briseis – Briseis underwing, ribbed underwing
 Catocala caesia – bluish-gray underwing
 Catocala californica (including C. erichi)
 Catocala californiensis
 Catocala cara – darling underwing
 Catocala carissima – carissima underwing (formerly in C. cara)
 Catocala cerogama – yellow-banded underwing
 Catocala charlottae (sometimes in C. praeclara)
 Catocala chelidonia
 Catocala cleopatra (sometimes in C. faustina)
 Catocala clintoni – Clinton's underwing
 Catocala coccinata – scarlet underwing
 Catocala concumbens – pink underwing, sleepy underwing
 Catocala connubialis – connubial underwing
 Catocala consors – consort underwing
 Catocala crataegi – hawthorn underwing, chokeberry underwing
 Catocala dejecta – dejected underwing
 Catocala delilah – Delilah underwing
 Catocala desdemona – Desdemona underwing (including C. ixion, formerly in C. delilah)
 Catocala dulciola – quiet underwing, sweet underwing
 Catocala electilis
 Catocala epione – Epione underwing (type of Mormonia)
 Catocala faustina
 Catocala flebilis – mournful underwing
 Catocala francisca (sometimes in C. hermia)
 Catocala frederici
 Catocala gracilis – graceful underwing
 Catocala grisatra – grisatra underwing
 Catocala grotiana – Grote's underwing
 Catocala grynea – woody underwing
 Catocala habilis – habilis underwing
 Catocala hermia – Hermia underwing (including C. sheba)
 Catocala herodias – Herodias' underwing, Gerhard's underwing
 Catocala hippolyta (sometimes in C. semirelicta)
 Catocala ilia – beloved underwing, Ilia underwing, wife underwing
 Catocala illecta – Magdalen underwing
 Catocala innubens – betrothed underwing
 Catocala insolabilis – inconsolable underwing
 Catocala irene – Irene's underwing
 Catocala jair – Jair underwing, barrens underwing
 Catocala jessica – Jessica underwing (including C. babayaga)
 Catocala johnsoniana – Johnson's underwing
 Catocala judith – Judith's underwing
 Catocala junctura – joined underwing, Stretch's underwing (including C. elsa, C. stretchii)
 Catocala lacrymosa – tearful underwing
 Catocala lincolnana – Lincoln underwing
 Catocala lineella – lineella underwing, little lined underwing, steely underwing (formerly in C. amica)
 Catocala louiseae – Louise's underwing (including C. protonympha)
 Catocala luciana – shining underwing
 Catocala maestosa – sad underwing
 Catocala manitoba – Manitoba underwing (sometimes in C. praeclara)
 Catocala marmorata – marbled underwing
 Catocala mcdunnoughi – McDunnough's underwing
 Catocala meskei – Meske's underwing
 Catocala messalina – Messalina underwing (type of Andrewsia)
 Catocala micronympha – little nymph underwing, little bride underwing
 Catocala minuta – little underwing
 Catocala mira – wonderful underwing
 Catocala miranda – Miranda underwing
 Catocala muliercula – little wife underwing
 Catocala myristica - Myristica underwing Kons & Borth, 2015
 Catocala nebulosa – clouded underwing
 Catocala neogama – the bride (including C. euphemia)
 Catocala nuptialis – married underwing
 Catocala obscura – obscure underwing
 Catocala ophelia
 Catocala orba – Orba underwing
 Catocala palaeogama – old wife underwing (sometimes in C. neogama)
 Catocala parta – mother underwing
 Catocala piatrix – penitent underwing
 Catocala praeclara – praeclara underwing
 Catocala pretiosa – precious underwing (formerly in C. crataegi)
 Catocala pretiosa texarkana – Texarkana underwing
 Catocala relicta – the relict, "white underwing"
 Catocala residua – residua underwing
 Catocala retecta – yellow-gray underwing
 Catocala (retecta) luctuosa – yellow-fringed underwing
 Catocala robinsoni – Robinson's underwing
 Catocala sappho – Sappho underwing
 Catocala semirelicta – semirelict underwing (including C. nevadensis, C. pura)
 Catocala serena – serene underwing
 Catocala similis – similar underwing
 Catocala sordida – sordid underwing
 Catocala subnata – youthful underwing
 Catocala texanae – Texan underwing
 Catocala ulalume – Ulalume underwing
 Catocala ultronia – dark red underwing, ultronia underwing
 Catocala umbrosa
 Catocala unijuga – once-married underwing
 Catocala verrilliana – Verrill's underwing
 Catocala vidua – widow underwing
 Catocala violenta
 Catocala whitneyi – Whitney's underwing

Comparison of North American species

Other "underwing moths"
As noted in the introduction, some species besides the Catocala species are also commonly known as "underwings". Typically however, the name is used with a qualifier, such as a color term, in these cases. Non-Catocala "underwing moths" are typically owlet moths, namely:
Subfamily Catocalinae
 Beautiful yellow underwing (Anarta myrtilli)
 Brown underwing (Minucia lunaris)
 Locust underwing (Euparthenos nubilis)
 (European) white underwing (Catephia alchymista) – in North America, "white underwing" typically refers to Catocala relicta
Subfamily Amphipyrinae
 Copper underwing (Amphipyra pyramidea)
 Svensson's copper underwing (Amphipyra berbera)
Subfamily Erebinae
 False underwing moth (Allotria elonympha)
Subfamily Hadeninae
 Black underwing (Mormo maura)
 Blossom underwing (Orthosia miniosa)
 Broad-bordered white underwing (Hadula melanopa)
 Guernsey underwing (Polyphaenis sericata)
 Lunar underwing (Omphaloscelis lunosa)
 Small dark yellow underwing (Coranarta cordigera)
 Small yellow underwing (Panemeria tenebrata)
 Straw underwing (Thalpophila matura)
Subfamily Noctuinae
 Pearly underwing (Peridroma saucia)
 Yellow underwings proper, some 15 species in the genus Noctua

However, the "orange underwings" are two species of genus Archiearis of the geometer moth family (Geometridae):
 Orange underwing (Archiearis parthenias)
 Light orange underwing (Archiearis notha)

Footnotes

References

 Fauna Europaea (FE) (2011): Catocala. Version 2.4, January 27, 2011. Retrieved March 29, 2012.
  
 Nelson, John M. & Loy, Peter W. (1983): The Underwing Moths (Lepidoptera: Noctuidae) of Oklahoma. Proceedings of the Oklahoma Academy of Science 63: 60–67. PDF fulltext
 Pitkin, Brian & Jenkins, Paul (2004a): Butterflies and Moths of the World, Generic Names and their Type-species – Blepharonia Hübner 1823. Version of November 5, 2004. Retrieved March 29, 2012.
 Pitkin, Brian & Jenkins, Paul (2004b): Butterflies and Moths of the World, Generic Names and their Type-species – Catocala. Version of November 5, 2004. Retrieved March 29, 2012.
 
 Stevens, Martin (2005): The role of eyespots as anti-predator mechanisms, principally demonstrated in the Lepidoptera. Biological Reviews 80(4): 573–588.  PDF fultlext
 Woodhouse, S. C. (1910): English-Greek Dictionary – A Vocabulary of the Attic Language. George Routledge & Sons Ltd., Broadway House, Ludgate Hill, E.C. Searchable JPEG fulltext

Further reading

 Ishizuka, K. (2002). "Notes on Catocala columbina Leech, 1900 (Lepidoptela, Noctuidae), with description of new taxa". Gekkan-Mushi. (379): 12–13.
 Ishizuka, K. (2007). "A new species of Catocala Schrank, 1802 from Western China (Lepidoptera, Noctuidae)". Gekkan-Mushi. (439): 22–24.
 Müller, Gunter; Kravchenko, Vasiliy; Witt, Thomas; Junnila, Amy; Mooser, J.; Saldaitis, Aidas; Reshöft, K.; Ivinskis, Povilas; Zahiri, Reza & Speidel, Wolfgang (2008). "New underwing taxa of the section of Catocala lesbia Christoph, 1887 (Lepidoptera: Noctuidae)". Acta Zoologica Lituanica. 18 (1): 30–49.
 Kravchenko, V. D., Speidel, W., et al. (2008). "A new species of Catocala from Israel (Lepidoptera: Noctuidae)". Acta Zoologica Lituanica. 18 (2): 127–129.
 Leech, J. J. (1900). Transactions of the Entomological Society of London. 1900: 511–663.
 Lewandowski, S. & Tober, K. (2008). "Catocala olgaorlovae duschara subspec. nov. aus Jordanien (Lepidoptera: Noctuidae)". Atalanta. 39 (1-4): 377–378.
 Saldaitis, A. & Ivinskis, P. (2008). "Catocala florianii, a new species (Lepidoptera: Noctuidae) from China". Acta Zoologica Lituanica. 18 (2): 124–126.
 Saldaitis, A. & Pekarsky, O. & Borth, R. (2014). "A new subspecies of Catocala pudica Moore, 1879 (Lepidoptera: Noctuidae (sensu lato): Erebinae) from Mongolia". Esperiana. 19: 255–262.
 Sinyaev, V., Saldaitis, A. & Ivinskis, P. (2007). Acta Zoologica Lituanica. 17 (4): 272–275.
 Speidel, W., Ivinskis, P. & Saldaitis, A. (2008). "A new Catocala species (Lepidoptera: Noctuidae) from China". Acta Zoologica Lituanica. 18 (2): 122–123.
 Weisert, F. (1998). Zeitschrift der Arbeitsgemeinschaft der Österreichischen Entomologen. 50: 125–126.

External links

 
 Oehlke, Bill (January 1, 2013). "Catocala: Classification and Common Names". Catocala. Retrieved January 13, 2019.

 
Noctuoidea genera